Environmentalism of the poor is a social movement that arises from environmental conflicts when impoverished people struggle against powerful state or private interests that threaten their livelihood, health, sovereignty, and culture. Part of the global environmental justice movement, it differs from mainstream environmentalism by emphasizing social justice issues instead of emphasizing conservation and eco-efficiency. It is becoming an increasingly important force for global sustainability.

Environmentalism of the poor includes a myriad of environmental movements in the global South that are strikingly under-represented in the discourse of mainstream environmentalism. However, impoverished people embroiled in local conflicts are becoming more aware of the global environmental justice movement, and trans-national environmental justice networks enable these environmental defenders to potentially leverage international support for their struggles.

Background 

In 1988, Peruvian historian Alberto Flores Galindo suggested the term 'environmentalism of the poor' to describe eco-socialist peasant resistance movements. In 1997 Joan Martinez-Alier and Ramachandra Guha contrasted these movements with the 'full-belly environmentalism' of the global North and drew parallels between rural and third-world 'environmentalism of the poor' and the more urban environmental justice movement arising in the United States.

In his 2002 book, Environmentalism of the Poor, Martinez-Alier describes three different currents within environmentalism: the 'cult of the wilderness' associated with the conservation movement and people like John Muir; the later 'gospel of eco-efficiency' that promotes sustainable development; and a growing environmental justice movement or 'environmentalism of the poor' that emphasises social justice and protection of land for the use of marginalised people. Martinez-Alier draws upon political ecology and ecological economics to create a theoretical basis for a global environmental justice movement that arises from local environmental conflicts.

Of these three currents within environmentalism, the growing environmentalism of the poor may be the strongest force for sustainability. This would contradict well-established ideas about sustainability: environmentalism has often been seen as the domain of affluent societies of the global North, because poor people are not interested in environmental concerns. For instance, the Brundtland Report concluded that poverty is one of the most important drivers of environmental degradation; political scientist Ronald Inglehart also argued that affluent societies are more likely to protect nature. Similarly, Kuznets curves associate environmental improvements with higher per-capita income, implying that the cure for environmental degradation is more growth. However, environmentalism of the poor points to numerous case studies where poor people protect the environment against powerful interests in order to defend their livelihoods and cultures.

Poor people simply protecting their livelihoods are often on the side of resource conservation and a clean environment, although they may not claim to be environmentalists and may use other language to describe their agendas (such as sacredness, sovereignty, etc). People will resist environmental destruction that threatens their livelihood, culture, and prospects for survival, even if they aren't interested in protecting nature for its own sake.  Ecological economics observes that values such as sovereignty and sacredness may be incommensurable with classical economic valuations: it may not be possible to assign monetary values to the externalised costs of resource extraction, such as loss of sacred sites or damages to future generations. Environmentalism of the poor is thus partly a struggle to control the valuation language applied to the costs and benefits of resource extraction, gentrification, and other processes that threaten poor people's use of their land.

Eco-feminism 

Female leadership is common to environmentalism of the poor, creating intersections with eco-feminism. Women more often have social roles that bring them into direct contact with nature such as collecting water, growing crops, tending animals, gathering, etc. In urban settings, women are most likely to take action against dumping of waste or other pollution, even if gendered hierarchies prevent their participation. Notable examples of environmentalism of the poor led by women activists are the Chipko movement in India and the Kenyan Green Belt Movement.

Global movement 
Political ecology scholars and environmental justice organizations are pointing toward a global environmental justice movement led by environmental defenders from the global poor. Local movements need international support to challenge major trans-national corporations, and environmentalism of the poor would need global influence to affect global issues such as the extinction crisis and climate change.

Increasingly, local conflicts are finding international support and wider influence. For example, the struggle against the Tipaimukh Dam in India originated with poor people whose water source was being threatened, and that conflict became a dynamic and international resistance movement. International networks such as Oilwatch have also arisen from direct action taken by Indigenous people fighting against oil exploration in places like the Niger delta, Colombia, and Peru.

References 

Environmental justice
Environmentalism